Marc-Antoine Olivier (born 18 June 1996) is a French competitive swimmer who specialises in long-distance open water events.

Career
Olivier's father and brother were both swimmers, which inspired him to take up the sport as well. He began swimming when he was seven in Denain, France, and he began open-water swimming at the age of fifteen. At the 2015 World Aquatics Championships he finished 6th in the 10 km open water, which qualified him for the Olympic marathon.

He won the bronze medal in the 10 km open water marathon at the 2016 Summer Olympics, outtouching Zu Lijun of China who was recorded in the same time.

He was qualified to represent France at the 2020 Summer Olympics where he finished 6th.

References

External links

1996 births
Living people
French male freestyle swimmers
French male long-distance swimmers
Olympic swimmers of France
Swimmers at the 2016 Summer Olympics
Medalists at the 2016 Summer Olympics
Olympic bronze medalists for France
Olympic bronze medalists in swimming
World Aquatics Championships medalists in open water swimming
European Aquatics Championships medalists in swimming
Sportspeople from Nord (French department)
20th-century French people
21st-century French people